Lee Sang-jun (born 14 October 1999) is a South Korean footballer currently playing as a defender for Jinju Citizen FCon loan from Busan IPark.

Career statistics

Club

Notes

Honours

International

South Korea U20
FIFA U-20 World Cup runner-up: 2019

References

1999 births
Living people
South Korean footballers
Association football defenders
K League 2 players
K4 League players
Busan IPark players
South Korea under-20 international footballers